The Wind is a 1928 American silent romantic drama film directed by Victor Sjöström. The movie was adapted by Frances Marion from the 1925 novel of the same name written by Dorothy Scarborough. Featuring Lillian Gish, Lars Hanson and Montagu Love, it is one of the last silent films released by Metro-Goldwyn-Mayer and is considered to be among the greatest silent films.

Plot
An impoverished young woman named Letty Mason (Lillian Gish) travels west by train from Virginia to live at her cousin Beverly's isolated ranch in Sweetwater, Texas. On the way, she is bothered by the constantly blowing wind. Fellow passenger and cattle buyer Wirt Roddy (Montagu Love) makes her acquaintance and tells her the wind usually drives women crazy.

Upon arrival, she is picked up by Beverly's closest neighbors, Lige Hightower (Lars Hanson) and the older, balding Sourdough (William Orlamond), who live 15 miles from her cousin. Wirt assures her he will drop by occasionally to see how she is doing.

After endless miles in sand and wind, they arrive at the ranch. Beverly (Edward Earle) is delighted to see her, but his jealous wife Cora (Dorothy Cumming) gives her a cold reception, despite Letty saying she and Beverly (who was raised by Letty's mother) are like brother and sister. Cora is further angered when her children seem to like Letty better.

At a party, Sourdough tells Lige that he intends proposing to Letty. Lige explains he was planning to do the same. After Wirt drops by, a cyclone interrupts the festivities. Most of the guests seek shelter in the basement, where Wirt declares his love for Letty and offers to take her away from the dismal place. After the cyclone passes, Lige and Sourdough talk to Letty in private. When they flip a coin to see who will ask for her hand in marriage (Lige wins), Letty thinks it is just a joke.

Afterward, Cora demands that Letty leave the ranch. Because she has neither money nor a place to go, she decides to go away with Wirt, but then Wirt reveals that he wants her for a mistress, informing her that he already has a wife. She goes back to Cora, who tells her to choose from her two other suitors. She marries Lige.

When Lige takes her home, he kisses Letty for the first time, but her lack of enthusiasm is unmistakable. Worse for the drink, he becomes more forceful, and she tells him she hates him. He promises he will never touch her, and will try to make enough money to send her back to Virginia. In the meantime, Letty works around the house, but is bothered by the ever-present wind.

One day, Lige is invited to a meeting of the cattlemen, who must do something to avoid starvation. Letty, terrified of being left alone with the wind, begs to go with him, and he agrees. After she cannot control her horse in the fierce wind, he has her get on behind him on his horse. When she falls off, Lige tells Sourdough to take her home.

When the cattlemen return, they bring an unwanted guest, an injured Wirt. After he recovers, Lige insists he participate in a roundup of wild horses to raise money for the cattlemen. Wirt goes along, but later sneaks away and returns to Letty. Out of her mind with fear as she endures the house shaking from the worst wind storm yet, Letty faints soon after Wirt's arrival. He picks her up and carries her to the bed.

The next morning, Wirt tries to persuade Letty to go away with him, but she coldly rejects him.  He insists, noting Lige will kill them both if they remain.  As Wirt becomes more aggressive, Letty picks up Wirt's revolver from the table to defend herself.  Confident that Letty will not fire, Wirt grabs the gun and it goes off, killing him. At first startled by Wirt's death, Letty looks confusedly at him and at the gun in her hand; she then decides to bury him outside.

After she is done, she goes back inside the cabin. The wind blows into an even greater fury, and Letty stares with mounting fear through a window as the wind gradually uncovers Wirt's body, terrifying her.  Letty runs away from the window, but then sees two hands clasped around the cabin's door trying to force it open; Letty hysterically believes it is Wirt returned from the dead, and falls prone with terror, her face hidden, as someone enters. The hands turn her over, and Letty stares upward blank with madness. However, it is actually Lige, who has returned. After a few moments, Letty returns to sanity and recognizes Lige; she is so glad to see him, she frantically kisses her husband. She then confesses she killed and buried Wirt. When Lige looks outside, however, the corpse is nowhere to be seen. He tells Letty that the wind can remove traces when a killing is justified. He has enough money to send her away, but Letty declares that she loves him, that she no longer wants to leave, and that she is no longer afraid of the wind or anything else.

Cast
 Lillian Gish as Letty Mason
 Lars Hanson as Lige Hightower
 Montagu Love as Wirt Roddy
 Dorothy Cumming as Cora
 Edward Earle as Beverly
 William Orlamond as Sourdough

Production

Gish came up with the idea of making a film adaptation of the novel of the same name. Irving Thalberg immediately gave her permission to do so. Gish recalled wanting Lars Hanson as her leading man after seeing him in a Swedish film with Greta Garbo. She also assigned Victor Sjöström as the director herself. Sjöström directed Gish before in the 1926 film The Scarlet Letter.

The film was shot partially near Bakersfield and the Mojave Desert, California.

In the original novel, the heroine is driven mad when the wind uncovers the corpse of the man she has killed.  She then wanders off into a windstorm to die.  According to Gish and popular legend, the original ending intended for the film was the unhappy ending, but it was changed due to the studio's powerful Eastern office decreeing that a more upbeat ending be shot. It is rumored that this tampering caused Seastrom to move back to Sweden. Mayer's biographer rejects this on account that the "sad ending" is not known to exist in any form, written or filmed. Regardless of whether an unhappy ending was originally intended, in the resulting film the "happy" ending replaced the original ending against the wishes of both Lillian Gish and Victor Seastrom.

Release
Although it was completed by the summer of 1927, the film's release was delayed by the studio until November 23 in 1928, a full year after the release of The Jazz Singer, when audiences wanted sound films. Gish recalled: “Mr. Thalberg said we had a very artistic film, which I knew was a veiled punch,”

Box office

Metro-Goldwyn-Mayer was nervous about releasing the film and did not release it for a full year until November 1928. It was released with a Movietone score and sound effects for theaters equipped with sound, however by that time, films with 100% dialogue/ talking sequences were being released in theaters, which contributed to The Wind recording an $87,000 loss.

Critical response
The Wind is considered to be a classic, and one of Gish's most brilliant performances. It is the last silent film starring Gish, the last directed by Sjostrom, and the last major silent released by MGM. At its time it was simultaneously panned and hailed by American critics, and its late release at the dawn of the sound era contributed to a net loss for the production. However, the film had significant critical and considerable commercial success in Europe.

When the film first opened in 1928, many critics panned it. Mordaunt Hall, film critic for The New York Times, for example, was very critical of the film and he found it difficult to suspend his disbelief regarding the special effects and Lillian Gish's acting.  He wrote, "Yesterday afternoon's rain was far more interesting than...The Wind,...The rain was real, and in spite of the lowering skies there was life and color around you. In the picture, the wind, whether it is a breeze or a cyclone, invariably seems a sham, and Lillian Gish, the stellar light in this new film, frequently poses where the wind is strongest; during one of the early episodes she does her bit to accentuate the artificiality of this tale by wearing the worst kind of hat for a wind. Victor Seastrom hammers home his points until one longs for just a suggestion of subtlety. The villain's sinister smile appears to last until his dying breath."

However, The Wind has gained significant prestige retroactively.

The British newspaper, The Guardian, in 1999 reviewed the work of director Victor Sjöström and they wrote, "And in America his three most famous works—He Who Gets Slapped (1924), The Scarlet Letter (1926) and The Wind (1928)—each dealt with human suffering. The Wind is almost certainly the best—a silent classic, revived in recent years by producer/director Kevin Brownlow with a Carl Davis score, which gave the great Lillian Gish one of the finest parts of her career...Sjostrom treats the inevitable clash between Letty and her new surroundings with considerable realism and detail, allowing Gish as much leeway as possible to develop her performance. The entire film was shot in the Mojave Desert under conditions of great hardship and difficulty and this was probably the first 'Western' that tried for truth as well as dramatic poetry. One of its masterstrokes, which looks far less self-conscious than any description of it may seem, is the moment
when Letty hallucinates in terror at the sight of the partially buried body of her attacker."

In a retrospective of silent films, the Museum of Modern Art screened The Wind and included a review of the film in their program.  They wrote, "What makes The Wind such an eloquent coda to its dying medium is Seastrom's and Gish's distillation of their art forms to the simplest, most elemental form: there are no frills. Seastrom was always at his best as a visual poet of natural forces impinging on human drama; in his films, natural forces convey drama and control human destiny. Gish, superficially fragile and innocent, could plumb the depths of her steely soul and find the will to prevail. The genius of both Seastrom and Gish comes to a climactic confluence in The Wind. Gish is Everywoman, subject to the most basic male brutality and yet freshly open to the possibility of romance. As a result, the film offers a quintessential cinematic moment of the rarest and most transcendentally pure art."

Legacy
In 1993, the film was selected for preservation in the United States National Film Registry by the Library of Congress as being "culturally, historically, or aesthetically significant."

Notes

References

External links
The Wind essay  by Fritzi Kramer at National Film Registry
The Wind essay by Daniel Eagan in America's Film Legacy: The Authoritative Guide to the Landmark Movies in the National Film Registry, A&C Black, 2010 , pages - 155-156 

 
 The Wind essay at Senses of Cinema by Adrian Danks
 The Wind at silentera.com database
 The Wind at Virtual History
 The Wind Review

1928 films
American black-and-white films
American romantic drama films
American silent feature films
Films based on American novels
Films directed by Victor Sjöström
Films shot in California
Films with screenplays by Frances Marion
Metro-Goldwyn-Mayer films
United States National Film Registry films
1928 romantic drama films
1920s American films
Silent romantic drama films
Silent American drama films